The 1968 National Football League draft was part of the common draft, in the second year in which the NFL and AFL held a joint draft of college players. It took place at the Belmont Plaza Hotel in New York City on January 30–31, 1968.

The Minnesota Vikings acquired the first overall pick in the draft through a trade with the New York Giants in March 1967 for quarterback Fran Tarkenton. When establishing the common draft between the NFL and AFL, the Giants were able to negotiate that they would receive the option to pick first in either the 1967 or 1968 NFL/AFL drafts, regardless of the presence of an expansion team or their own record from the previous season. They traded this "special wild card" pick in the Tarkenton trade, and the Vikings chose to exercise it in 1968. The expansion Cincinnati Bengals picked second. The Vikings used the first overall pick to select offensive tackle Ron Yary.

This was the last draft until 1980 in which the Washington Redskins exercised their first-round pick. Most of them were traded away by coach George Allen between 1971 and 1977 due to Allen's well-known preference for veteran players over rookies.

Player selections

Round one

Round two

Round three

Round four

Round five

Round six

Round seven

Round eight

Round nine

Round ten

Round eleven

Round twelve

Round thirteen

Round fourteen

Round fifteen

Round sixteen

Round seventeen

Hall of Famers
 Larry Csonka, running back from Syracuse, taken 1st round 8th overall by AFL's Miami Dolphins
Inducted: Professional Football Hall of Fame class of 1987.
 Art Shell, offensive tackle from Maryland Eastern Shore, taken 3rd round 80th overall by AFL's Oakland Raiders
Inducted: Professional Football Hall of Fame class of 1989.
 Ron Yary, offensive tackle from Southern California, taken 1st round 1st overall by Minnesota Vikings
Inducted: Professional Football Hall of Fame class of 2001.
 Elvin Bethea, offensive tackle from North Carolina A&T, taken 3rd round 77th overall by AFL's Houston Oilers
Inducted: Professional Football Hall of Fame class of 2003.
 Charlie Sanders, tight end from Minnesota, taken 3rd round 74th overall by Detroit Lions
Inducted: Professional Football Hall of Fame class of 2007.
 Curley Culp, defensive tackle from Arizona State, taken 2nd round 31st overall by AFL's Denver Broncos
Inducted: Professional Football Hall of Fame class of 2013.
 Claude Humphrey, defensive end from Tennessee State, taken 1st round 3rd overall by Atlanta Falcons
Inducted: Professional Football Hall of Fame class of 2014.
 Ken Stabler, quarterback from Alabama, taken 2nd round 52nd overall by AFL's Oakland Raiders
Inducted: Professional Football Hall of Fame class of 2016.

Notable undrafted players

References

External links
 NFL.com – 1968 Draft 
 databaseFootball.com – 1968 Draft
 Pro Football Hall of Fame

National Football League Draft
Draft
Draft NFL
NFL Draft
NFL Draft
American football in New York City
1960s in Manhattan
Sporting events in New York City
Sports in Manhattan